Llys Halt in Gwynedd, Wales, was on the Ruabon to Barmouth line. There was no passing place or freight activity here.

There was a single platform on the south-east side, provided with an open-front shelter, and a single nameboard reading "Llys Halt". Approximately  to the south-east was Llys Crossing, which was gated and staffed; this was provided with a crossing keepers house. In addition to the main gates for road vehicles, there were swing wickets for pedestrians. The crossing was controlled from Llanuwchllyn. Today a garden hedgerow covers the site of the platform.

Neighbouring stations

References

Further reading

External links
 Llys Halt on navigable 1946 O.S. map

Beeching closures in Wales
Railway stations in Great Britain opened in 1934
Railway stations in Great Britain closed in 1965
Disused railway stations in Gwynedd
Llanuwchllyn
Former Great Western Railway stations